The 2014 Girls' Youth NORCECA Volleyball Championship played by nine countries from June 22–30, 2014 in San José, Costa Rica. The Dominican Republic won the tournament for the first time and qualified for the 2015 FIVB Girls' World Championship along with the United States and Mexico. Dominican Republic player Natalia Martínez won the Most Valuable Player award.

Competing Nations

Squads

Preliminary round

Group A

|}

|}

Group B

|}

|}

Group C

|}

|}

Final round

Championship bracket

7th-9th places bracket

Classification 7/9

|}

Quarterfinals

|}

Semifinals

|}

Seventh place match

|}

Fifth place match

|}

Bronze medal match

|}

Final

|}

Final standing

Individual awards

Most Valuable Player
 
Best Setter
 
Best Opposite
 
Best Outside Hitters
 
 

Best Middle Blockers
 
 
Best Libero

References

External links

Women's NORCECA Volleyball Championship
NORCECA Volleyball Championship
Volleyball